Group 4 of the UEFA Euro 1972 qualifying tournament was one of the eight groups to decide which teams would qualify for the UEFA Euro 1972 finals tournament. Group 4 consisted of four teams: Soviet Union, Spain, Northern Ireland, and Cyprus, where they played against each other home-and-away in a round-robin format. The group winners were the Soviet Union, who finished two points above Spain.

Final table

Matches

Goalscorers

References
 
 
 

Group 4
1970 in Soviet football
1971 in Soviet football
1970–71 in Spanish football
1971–72 in Spanish football
1970–71 in Northern Ireland association football
1971–72 in Northern Ireland association football

Soviet Union at UEFA Euro 1972